Paraswammerdamia conspersella is a moth of the family Yponomeutidae. It is found in northern Europe, Ukraine, France and Switzerland. It was recently reported from Canada (Québec).

The wingspan is 11–14 mm. Adults are on wing from June to August.

The larvae feed on Empetrum nigrum. They initially mine the leaves of their host plant. After overwintering, they feed freely on the leaves from within a silk web. Mining larvae can be found in autumn.

References

Moths described in 1848
Yponomeutidae
Moths of Europe